Gloria Deniz Ramos Prudencio (born December 2, 1955) is a Peruvian politician and a Congresswoman who represented Pasco for the 2006–2011 term. Ramos belongs to the Union for Peru party.

External links
Official Congressional Site

Living people
Union for Peru politicians
Members of the Congress of the Republic of Peru
21st-century Peruvian women politicians
21st-century Peruvian politicians
1955 births
Place of birth missing (living people)
People from Pasco Region
Women members of the Congress of the Republic of Peru